This is an episode list for The Lion King's Timon & Pumbaa, an American animated television series made by Walt Disney Television Animation. It follows the adventures of Timon the meerkat and Pumbaa the warthog from the 1994 Disney film The Lion King, as they live their problem-free philosophy Hakuna Matata. Rafiki, the hyenas, and Zazu are also given their own segments.

Much like Aladdin, almost every episode title is a parody of a famous movie, song, phrase, or TV show. Geographic place names, usually those where an episode is set, form the basis of the puns, for example "To Kilimanjaro Bird" is a combination of the novel To Kill a Mockingbird and the name of the mountain Kilimanjaro; "Kenya Be My Friend" & "Catch Me if you Kenya" feature the name of Kenya, Africa.

In the fall of 1995, 13 episodes premiered on Friday afternoons on the syndicated Disney Afternoon block, and 12 more episodes aired on Saturday mornings on CBS at the same time. In the fall of 1996, 13 new episodes aired on The Disney Afternoon, with 8 more premiering on CBS. In 1998, 39 new episodes were produced due to overseas demand. These episodes began airing on Toon Disney on January 1, 1999.

In the third season characters like Simba, Speedy the Snail, Fred, Irwin, Boss Beaver, the Vulture Police, Rabbit, Toucan Dan, and the Natives are absent.

Series overview

Episode segments 
Each segment of the episodes in the first season starring The Lion King Characters:
 "Timon & Pumbaa": starring Timon and Pumbaa.
 "Rafiki Fables": starring Rafiki.
 "The Laughing Hyenas": starring Shenzi, Banzai and Ed.
 Songs: starring Timon and Pumbaa singing a song.

Episodes

Season 1 (1995) 
Timon is voiced by Nathan Lane & Quinton Flynn in this season. Lane, Timon's original voice actor, reprises his role as the character in 10 episodes while Flynn fills in for him in 31 episodes.

Season 2 (1996) 
Kevin Schon, who sung the show's theme song "Hakuna Matata", voices Timon in this season and onwards, replacing both Nathan Lane and Quinton Flynn.

Season 3 (1999) 
As of this season, the show was produced in Canada by Studio B Productions for Walt Disney Television Animation, with a new staff of producers, directors, writers (mostly), and storyboard artists. The episodes now open with the same title card artwork that is used in "Catch Me If You Kenya". These episodes premiered on the now-defunct Toon Disney.

Notes 

Episodes
Lists of Disney Channel television series episodes
Lists of American children's animated television series episodes